Miloslav Rechcigl, Jr., or Mila Rechcigl, is a trained biochemist, nutritionist and cancer researcher, writer, editor, historian, bibliographer and genealogist. He was one of the founders and past President for many years of the Czechoslovak Society of Arts and Sciences.

Biography
Rechcigl was born on 30 July 1930 in Mladá Boleslav, Czechoslovakia. His father, Miloslav Rechcigl, Sr., was a prominent politician in the pre-World War II Czechoslovakia, having been elected as the youngest member to the Czechoslovak Parliament and who held the position of President of the Millers Association of Bohemia and Moravia. After the communist takeover, he escaped from his native country and in 1950 immigrated to the United States, where he became a naturalized citizen in 1955. He studied at Cornell University from 1951 to 1958, receiving his B.S., M.N.S., and Ph.D. degrees there, specializing in biochemistry, nutrition, physiology, and food science.

He then spent two years conducting research at the National Institutes of Health in Bethesda, Maryland, as a Postdoctoral Research Fellow. Subsequently, he was appointed as research biochemist to the staff of the Laboratory of Biochemistry at the National Cancer Institute.  During 1968–69 he was selected for one year of training in a special USPHS executive program in health administration, research management, grants administration, and science policy.

This led to his appointment as Special Assistant for Nutrition and Health in the Health Services and Mental Health Administration. In 1970 he joined the US Agency for International Development, which was originally a part of the US Department of State, as nutrition advisor and later was put in charge of research program.

Research activities
In his research, he initially specialized in amino acid metabolism, including the utilization of D-amino acids and non specific forms of nitrogen. He then studied the relationship between protein and vitamin A which led to the finding that the amount, as well as biological value, of dietary protein are important in the process of converting carotene to vitamin A.
Other studies dealt with metabolic changes during cachexia of tumor-bearing animals. One of the most striking effects of tumor on the host was the depression of enzyme catalase in the livers and in the kidneys which some investigators thought  was due to a hypothetical substance, referred to as toxohormone. This was disproved by finding significant levels of the enzyme in liver tumors.

A number of his studies dealt with the question of enzyme turnover in vivo. Using specific metabolic inhibitors, he evaluated relative rates of synthesis and degradation of the enzyme catalase under a variety of physiological, pathological and pharmacological conditions. These studies led to the conclusion that the rate of synthesis rather than the rate of destruction may be the preferential way of the mammalian organism to control its enzyme levels.

His finding of greatly different levels of catalase activity in certain substrains of  mice, which were under genetic control, provided an excellent model for pursuing fundamental research in biochemical genetics in the mammalian system. The analyses of the first, the second the backcross generations between high-enzyme and low-enzyme mouse substrains showed that the difference was due to a single autosomal gene pair with low dominant to high. Using specific metabolic inhibitors, it was subsequently found that the genetic difference between the two substrains lies primarily in the markedly increased rate of the enzyme destruction in the liver of one of the substrains. This was a unique finding since in all normal rats and mice studied previously the rates of enzyme destruction seemed to be almost constant. Although transient alteration in the rate of enzyme degradation has been observed under certain physiological conditions with other enzyme systems, the observation on catalase iwas believed to be the first demonstration of such regulatory mechanism under genetic control.

Other studies dealt with the morphology, biochemistry and physiology of microbodies, on which he collaborated with Prof. Z.. Hruban of the University of Chicago, that led to the monograph Microbodies and Related Particles (1969).

Scientific publications
He is the author or editor of over thirty monographs and handbooks  in the field of biochemistry, physiology, nutrition, food science and food technology, agriculture, and international development, in addition to a large number of scientific articles and book chapters, including:

Monographs
 Microbodies and Related Particles. (International Review of Cytology. Supplement No. 1). New York and London, Academic Press, 1969. 296 pp.; also in Russian.
 Enzyme Synthesis and Degradation in Mammalian Systems. Basel-Munchen-Paris-London-New York-Sydney: S. Karger, 1971. 477 pp.
 Food, Nutrition and Health. A Multidisciplinary Treatise Addressed to the Major Nutrition Problems from a World Wide Perspective. Basel-Munchen- Paris-London-New York-Sydney: S. Karger, 1973. 516 pp.
 Man, Food, and Nutrition. Strategies and Technological Measures for Alleviating the World Food Problem. Cleveland, OH: CRC Press, 1973. 344 pp.
 World  Food Problem. A Selective Bibliography of Reviews. Cleveland, OH: CRC Press, 1975. 211 pp.
 Comparative Animal Nutrition. Vol. 1. Carbohydrates, Lipids, and accessory Growth Factors. Basel-Munchen-Paris-London-New York-Sydney: S. Karger, 1976. 223 pp.
 Comparative Animal Nutrition. Vol. 2 Nutrient Elements and Toxicants. Basel-Munchen-Paris-London-New York-Sydney: S. Karger, 1977. 208 pp.
 Comparative Animal Nutrition. Vol. 3. Nitrogen, Electrolytes, Water and Energy Metabolism. Basel-Munchen-Paris-London-New York- Sydney: S.Karger, 1979. 260 pp.
 Comparative Animal Nutrition. Vol. 4. Physiology of Growth and Nutrition. Basel-Munchen-Paris-London-New York-Sydney: S. Karger, 1981. 341 pp.
 Nutrition and World Food Problem. Basel-Munchen-Paris-London-New York-Sydney: S. Karger, 1979. 375 pp.

Handbooks
 CRC Handbook Series in Nutrition and Food.  Nutritional Requirements. Vol. 1. Comparative and Quantitative Requirements. Cleveland, OH: CRC Press, 1977. 551 pp.
 CRC Handbook Series in Nutrition and Food. Sect. G. Diets, Culture Media, Food Supplements. Vol. 1. Dits for Mammals. Cleveland, OH: CRC Press, 1977. 645 pp.
 CRC Handbook Series in Nutrition and Food. Sect. G. Diets, Culture Media, Food Supplements. Vol. 2. Food Habits of and Diets for Invertebrates and Vertebrates. Zoo diets. Cleveland, OH: CRC Press, 1977. 462 pp.
 CRC Handbook Series in Nutrition and Food. Sect. G. Diets, Culture Media, Food Supplements. Vol. 3. Culture Media for Microorganisms and Plants. Cleveland, OH: CRC Press, 1978. 647 pp.
 CRC Handbook Series in Nutrition and Food. Sect. G. Diets, Culture Media, Food Supplements. Vol. 4. Culture Media for Cells, Organs and Embryos. Cleveland, OH: CRC Press, 1977. 469 pp.
 CRC Handbook Series in Nutrition and Food. Sect. E. Nutritional Disorders. Vol. 1. Effect of Nutrient Excesses and Toxicities in Animals and Man. West Palm Beach, FL: CRC Press, 1978. 518 pp.
 CRC Handbook Series in Nutrition and Food. Sect. E. Nutritional Disorders. Vol. 2. Effect of Nutrient Deficiencies in Animals. West Palm Beach, FL: CRC Press, 1978. 548 pp.
 CRC Handbook Series in Nutrition and Food. Sect. E. Nutritional Disorders. Vol. 3. Effect of Nutrient Deficiencies in Man. West Palm Beach, FL: CRC Press, 1978. 388 pp.
 CRC Handbook of Nutritional Requirements in a Functional Context. Vol. 1. Development and Conditions of Physiologic Stress. Boca Raton, Florida: CRC Press, 1981. 542 pp.
 CRC Handbook of Nutritional Requirements in a Functional context. vol. 2. Hematopoiesis and Resistance to Physical Stress. Boca Raton, Florida: CRC Press, 1981. 594 pp.
 CRC Handbook of Nutritive Value of Processed Food. vol. 1. Food for Human Use. Boca Raton, Florida: CRC Press, 1982. 679 pp.
 CRC Handbook of Nutritive Value of Processed Food. Vol. 2. Animal Feedstuffs. Boca Raton, Florida: CRC Press, 1982. 499 pp.
 CRC Handbook of Agricultural Productivity. Vol. 1. Plant Productivity. Boca Raton, Florida: CRC Press, 1982. 468 pp.
 CRC Handbook of Agricultural Productivity. vol. 2. Animal Productivity. Boca Raton, Florida: CRC Press, 1982. 396 pp. CRC Handbook of Nutritional Supplements. Vol. 1. Human Use. Boca Raton, Florida: CRC Press, 1983. 564 pp.
 CRC Handbook of Nutritional Supplements. Vol. 2. Agricultural Use. Boca Raton, Florida: CRC Press, 1983. 412 pp.
 CRC Hanndvook of Naturally Occurring Food Toxicants. Boca Raton. FL: CRC Press, 1983. 339 pp.
 CRC Handbook of Foodborne Diseases of Biological Origin. Boca Raton, Florida: CRC Press, 1983. 518 pp.

Czech-American activism
Apart from his purely scientific endeavors as a researcher and science administrator, Dr. Rechcigl devoted almost 50 years of his life to the Czechoslovak Society of Arts and Sciences (SVU), an international organization, with headquarters in Washington, D. C.
He was responsible for the first two Society's World Congresses, both of which were a great success and which put the Society on the world map. He also edited the Congress lectures and arranged for their publication, under the title The Czechoslovak Contribution to World Culture  and Czechoslovakia Past and Present The publications received acclaim in the American academic circles and greatly contributed to the growing prestige of the Society worldwide.

Dr. Rechcigl was also involved, one way or another, with most of the subsequent SVU World Congresses, including the recent SVU Congresses in Prague, Brno, Bratislava, Washington, D.C., Plzeň, Olomouc and České Budějovice. Prior to his last term as the SVU President (2004–06), he held similar posts during 1974–76, 1976–78, and again in 1994–96, 1996–98, 1998–2000, 2000–02 and 2002–04.

In 1999, in conjunction with President Václav Havel's visit to Minnesota, he organized a memorable conference at the University of Minnesota on "Czech and Slovak America: Quo Vadis?"

Together with his wife Eva, he published eight editions of the SVU Biographical Directory, the last of which was printed in Prague in 2003.  He was instrumental in launching a new English periodical Kosmas. Czechoslovak and Central European Journal. He also proposed the establishment of the SVU Research Institute  and the creation of the SVU Commission for Cooperation with Czechoslovakia, and its Successor States, the Czech Republic and Slovakia, which played an important role in the first years after the Velvet Revolution of 1989. Under the sponsorship of the SVU Research Institute, together with his colleagues, he conducted a series of workshops  about research management and the art of "grantsmanship" for scientists and scholars, as well as for the administrators and science policy makers, at Czech and Slovak universities, the Academies of Sciences (Academy of Sciences of the Czech Republic, Slovak Academy of Sciences) and the Government.

He established the National Heritage Commission with the aim of preserving Czech and Slovak cultural heritage in America. Under its aegis, he had undertaken a comprehensive survey of Czech-related historic sites and archival materials in the US. Based on this survey, he has prepared a detailed listing, Czech-American Historic Sites, Monuments, and Memorials which was published through the courtesy of Palacký University of Olomouc (2004). The second part of the survey, bearing the title Czechoslovak American Archivalia,. was also published by Palacky University (2004).

Among historians, Dr. Rechcigl is well known for his studies on history, genealogy, and bibliography of Czech Americans and Slovak Americans.  A number of his publications deal with the early immigrants from the Czech lands and Slovakia, including the immigration of Moravian Brethren to America. In the last few years he has been working on the cultural contributions of Czech Americans and Slovak Americans.  A selection of his biographical portraits of prominent Czech Americans from the 17th century to date has been published in Prague, under the title Postavy nasí Ameriky (Personalities of our America). On the occasion of his 75th birthday, the Society  published a collection of his essays, under the title Czechs and Slovaks in America, as a part of the East European Monographs series, distributed by the Columbia University Press.

Recognition
Dr. Rechcigl is a member of the Honor Society of Phi Kappa Phi, member of the Scientific Research Society of the Sigma Xi, member of the Cosmos Club, Honorary Member of the International Honor Society of Delta Tau Kappa and Honorary  Member of the Czechoslovak Society of Arts and Sciences. He was also elected a Fellow of the American Association for the Advancement of Science (AAAS), Fellow of the Washington Academy of Sciences and Fellow of the American Institute of Chemists (AIC) and Fellow of the International College of Applied Nutrition.

In 1991, on the occasion of its 100th anniversary, the Czechoslovak Academy of Sciences awarded him the Hlavka Memorial Medal. In 1997 he received a newly established prize "Gratias agit" from the Ministry of Foreign Affairs of the Czech Republic. In 1999, on the occasion of President Václav Havel's visit to the US, President Havel presented him, on behalf of SVU, the Presidential Memorial Medal.  More recently, he was given an honorary title Nebraska Admiral ("Admiral of the Great Navy of the State of Nebraska")by the Governor of Nebraska Mike Johanns and the key to the Capital of Nebraska by the Mayor of Lincoln and the SVU Prague Chapter awarded him the 2002 Prague SVU Award. In 2005, the Minister of Foreign Affairs of the Czech Republic Cyril Svoboda honored him by awarding him the Jan Masaryk Medal  for his contributions in preserving and fostering relations between the Czech Republic and the United States. In 2006 he received Comenius Award from the Czech Center Museum Houston.

Personal life
Mila Rechcigl lives with his wife Eva in Washington, D.C. area. They have two children, Jack and Karen, who live in Florida. Jack Rechcigl is a professor of soil and water sciences at University of Florida and Director of Gulf Coast Research and Education Center in Wimauma.

References

External links
Rechcigl's bio on SVU Website
Rechcigl's Professional Page
Rechcigl's Writings on Czechoslovak America: A Bibliography
Rechcigl's New book on Czechs and Slovaks in America
Historian/Genealogist on Czechs and Slovaks in America
Rechcigl named SVU Archivist
Rechcigl put in charge of Czech American Biography
Czechoslovak Society of Arts and Sciences

1930 births
Living people
American archivists
American people of Bohemian descent
American nutritionists
21st-century American biochemists
American physiologists
Women physiologists
American book editors
American genealogists
American bibliographers
American editors
American non-fiction writers
American encyclopedists
American information and reference writers
Cornell University alumni
Czechoslovak emigrants to the United States
Czech expatriates in the United States
Czech language activists
Czech-American culture in Maryland
Fellows of the American Association for the Advancement of Science
American civil servants
People from Rockville, Maryland
People from Mladá Boleslav
People from the Washington metropolitan area
Historians from Maryland